Bharath Bopanna (born 7 September 1992) is an Indian model and film actor in the Kannada cinema. He is popularly known by his TV screen name "Lucky"

Bharath made his debut in Sandalwood through a Kannada film named Demo Piece produced by Sparsha Rekha.

Career

2016-present
In 2016, Bharath made his television debut as a lead playing character "Rajavardhana", socio-mythological Kannada serial Girija kalyana directed by Naveen Krishna and produced by Arka Media Works the filmmakers of Baahubali: The Beginning and Baahubali 2: The Conclusion. He became very popular for playing the lead role "Lucky" as a Kabaddi champion in a popular serial Bramhagantu. He even played a lead role "Rocky" in Telugu named "Jyothi" directed and produced by Baashha fame director Suresh Krissna telecasted on Star Maa. He contested in a celebrity dance reality show named "Dance Karnataka Dance" telecasted in Zee Kannada. He made his debut in Sandalwood through a Kannada film named "Demo Piece" produced by Sparsha Rekha.

Filmography

•  All the films are in Kannada language, unless otherwise noted.

Television

References

External links 
 
 
 
 
 
 
 
 

 

1992 births
Living people
21st-century Indian male actors
Indian male film actors
Indian male television actors
Male actors in Kannada cinema
Kannada male actors
Kannada people
People from Kodagu district